Gilmore–Patterson Farm is a historic home and farm located near St. Pauls, Bladen County, North Carolina.  The Patterson farmhouse was built about 1872 in the late Greek Revival style, and modified about 1890 in the Queen Anne style. It is a frame one-story dwelling with a central hall plan. Also on the property are the contributing a smokehouse, an outhouse, a (former) post office, a mule barn, three tobacco barns, a garage, a granary, and two tenant houses.

It was added to the National Register of Historic Places in 1999.

References

Farms on the National Register of Historic Places in North Carolina
Greek Revival houses in North Carolina
Queen Anne architecture in North Carolina
Houses completed in 1872
Houses in Bladen County, North Carolina
National Register of Historic Places in Bladen County, North Carolina